Blue Views is the fifth solo studio album by the English singer-songwriter Paul Carrack, then a member of the supergroup Mike + The Mechanics. It was Carrack's first solo album in seven years; in the interim period between solo albums, he had recorded one album as a member of Squeeze, one album as a member of Spin 1ne 2wo, and two albums as a member of Mike + The Mechanics.  Blue Views was originally released in 1995 on I.R.S. Records in the UK and most other territories.  In the US, it appeared on the Ark 21 label.

The album was produced by Carrack's erstwhile Mike + The Mechanics bandmate Peter Van Hooke, who had left the group the previous year.  Blue Views spun off two UK top 40 hits:  "Eyes of Blue" and a re-recording of "How Long", which Carrack had originally written and sung 22 years earlier as a member of the band Ace.

In the US, "Eyes of Blue" was a minor hit on the Adult Contemporary (AC) charts, while the track "For Once in Our Lives" was a major AC hit, peaking at #3.

The song "Love Will Keep Us Alive", a Carrack co-wrote, had been previously recorded by The Eagles for their 1994 album Hell Freezes Over.

Reception

AllMusic's Stephen Thomas Erlewine calls Blue Views "solid adult contemporary pop", and while criticizing some of the "spotty" material, writes that "Carrack's vocals are terrific and the sound is appealingly polished."

Track listing

Personnel 
Credits are adapted from the album's liner notes.
 Paul Carrack – vocals, keyboards
 Rod Argent – keyboards
 Tim Renwick – guitars (1-6, 8-11)
 Robbie McIntosh – guitars (1-6, 8-11)
 Mitch Dalton – classical guitar (1)
 Neil Hubbard – guitars (7)
 Pino Palladino – bass (1-7, 9, 10, 11)
 Keith Wilkinson – bass (8)
 Andy Newmark – drums
 Martin Ditcham – percussion
 Luís Jardim – percussion
 Frank Ricotti – percussion
 Roger Chase – viola (10)
 Bill Hawkins – viola (10)
 Perry Montague-Mason – violin (10)
 Gavyn Wright – violin (10)
 Katie Kissoon – backing vocals
 Tessa Niles – backing vocals
 Lance Ellington – backing vocals (5, 9, 10)

Production 
 Producer – Peter Van Hooke
 Engineers – Paul Mortimer and Simon Smart 
 Assistant Engineers – Danny Dawson, Paul Hicks, Robbie Kazandjian and Guy Massey.
 Mixing – John Brough and Simon Smart
 Mastered by Chris Blair 
 Recorded, Mixed and Mastered at Abbey Road Studios (London, UK).
 Photography – Paul Cox

Certifications

References

External links

1995 albums
I.R.S. Records albums
Paul Carrack albums